Balacobaco is an album by Brazilian rock singer Rita Lee, It was released in 2003.

Track listing

Certifications and sales

References

2003 albums
Rita Lee albums
EMI Records albums